These are the late night schedules for the four United States broadcast networks that offer programming during this time period, from September 2006 to August 2007. All times are Eastern or Pacific. Affiliates will fill non-network schedule with local, syndicated, or paid programming. Affiliates also have the option to preempt or delay network programming at their discretion.

Legend

Schedule

Monday-Friday

Note: On NBC, Poker After Dark premiered on January 1, 2007, the network took back the 2:00 a.m. timeslot from its affiliates. Some NBC affiliates did not air Poker After Dark in the 2:00 a.m. timeslot, opting to air syndicated programming, encore of late local news or paid programming instead.

Saturday

By network

ABC

Returning series
ABC World News Now
ABC World News This Morning
Jimmy Kimmel Live!
Nightline

New series
America This Morning

CBS

Returning series
CBS Morning News
Late Show with David Letterman
The Late Late Show with Craig Ferguson
Up to the Minute

Fox

Returning series
MADtv

New series
Talkshow with Spike Feresten

NBC

Returning series
Early Today
Last Call with Carson Daly
Late Night with Conan O'Brien
Saturday Night Live
The Tonight Show with Jay Leno

New series
Poker After Dark

References
TV Listings - New York Times http://tvlistings.zap2it.com/tvlistings/ZCGrid.do?fromTimeInMillis=1244797200000

United States late night network television schedules
2006 in American television
2007 in American television